Julian Bartoszewicz (1821–1870) was a Polish historian.

Bartoszewicz wrote a biography on Nicolaus Copernicus, which was published together with the Collected Works of Copernicus in 1854 in Warsaw. He  became internationally known for the biography.

Works 
Poglądy na stosunki Polski z Turcją i Tatarami (1860)

References

1821 births
1870 deaths
19th-century Polish historians
Polish male non-fiction writers